Gert Frank (15 March 1956 – 19 January 2019) was a cyclist and Olympic medalist from Denmark.

Amateur
Frank won the bronze medal in the Team Time Trial event at the 1976 Summer Olympics in Montreal, alongside Verner Blaudzun, Jørgen Hansen and Jørn Lund.

Professional
Frank was predominantly a track cyclist and won 20 indoor Six-day racing events, including the 1981 Six Days of Ghent race with Patrick Sercu. He also won the Madison at the European Track Championships in 1981 and 1983 (with Hans-Henrik Ørsted) and in 1985 (with René Pijnen). Additionally he won the European Derny championship in 1984.

References 

1956 births
2019 deaths
Danish male cyclists
Olympic cyclists of Denmark
Cyclists at the 1976 Summer Olympics
Olympic bronze medalists for Denmark
Olympic medalists in cycling
People from Hobro
Medalists at the 1976 Summer Olympics
Sportspeople from the North Jutland Region